D2C can mean:

 Direct-to-consumer, as in D2C advertising
 Daigou-to-consumer, as in daigou  buying products and goods overseas on behalf of people living in China
 D2C Games, Inc., a digital games company
 Ford D2C platform